Canaris is Chris Brokaw's fourth solo album. Released on 23 September 2008 by Capitan Records, Canaris was in June 2008. Largely an acoustic release, the album was recorded by Aaron Mullan at Sonic Youth's Echo Canyon studio in Hoboken, NJ (tracks 1–3), and Adam Taylor at Paul Kolderie and Sean Slade's Camp Street studio (formerly Fort Apache Studios) in Cambridge, MA (tracks 4–6). All its songs are Brokaw's compositions, with the exception of a cover of Drink the Poetry of the Celtic Disciple, written and originally performed by French black metal band Vlad Tepes.

The album was published in a CD-only digipak format and it is notable for being the first release of Capitan Records, an independent label founded by Brokaw.

Critical reception 

The Boston Globe stated that "his new solo album, 'Canaris', puts the spotlight right where it belongs: on his phenomenal acoustic guitar playing." Similarly, Time Out New York gave the album its highest rating of five stars, asserting that Brokaw's "two main '90s bands, Codeine and Come, specialized in crushing emotional intensity, and since those days his expressive power has only grown"; regarding Canaris''' rendition of Vlad Tepes's Drink the Poetry of the Celtic Disciple, the same review stated: "This is Brokaw at his best." In his review of the album for Prefix Magazine, Nick Neyland states that "Canaris fills a satisfying gap that falls somewhere in-between the comatose blackout of Sunn O))) and the genteel psychedelic folk of Keith Wood's Hush Arbors", going on to suggest that "deep in the heart of Canaris is the title track, a heroic slab of treated drone rock that sounds like Brokaw has been inhaled by a colossal black hole and is performing as all the atoms in his body slowly separate." Blurt magazine's review of the album described it as "a brief but wonderful exploration of the acoustic and electric, blues-traditional and experimental byways [Brokaw] and his guitar have traveled." The review declares the album's title track to be "[t]he disc's centerpiece", in which "Brokaw does battle with tone and dissonance and murky dreamlike atmospherics."

Whilst Nate Knaebel, in his review for Dusted Magazine, acknowledges that Canaris "does shine a light on [Brokaw's] undeniable skills", he goes on to states that "[t]racks such as album opener 'Exemptive' and 'Watching the Clouds' aren't going to blow any minds." Overall, Knaebel's response to the album is mixed, although he admits that "[a]nyone familiar with Brokaw's work knows that the guy can play the guitar." In his review of Canaris'' for PopMatters, Matthew Fiander writes that "Brokaw always excelled as part of bands like Codeine and Come in the past, but here, with no bass or drums to work with his guitar, with his sound left to stand alone, he still sounds like one of the most compelling guitarists in music today."

Track listing 

All songs performed solo by Chris Brokaw. All songs written by Brokaw, unless otherwise noted.

Personnel 

 Chris Brokaw – acoustic guitars

Additional personnel

 Aaron Mullan – Producer
 Adam Taylor – Producer

References

External links 
 Chris Brokaw's Official Website
 Discogs entry for Canaris
 Neyland, Nick, "Review of Chris Brokaw's Canaris", in Prefix Magazine
 Knaebel, Nate, "Review of Chris Brokaw's Canaris", in Dusted Magazine

Chris Brokaw albums
2008 albums